Blanchard's transsexualism typology is a proposed psychological typology of gender dysphoria, transsexualism, and fetishistic transvestism, created by sexologist Ray Blanchard through the 1980s and 1990s, building on the work of earlier researchers, including his colleague Kurt Freund. Blanchard categorized trans women into two groups: homosexual transsexuals who are attracted exclusively to men and are feminine in both behavior and appearance; and autogynephilic transsexuals who experience sexual arousal at the idea of having a female body.

Blanchard's work has attracted significant controversy, especially following the 2003 publication of J. Michael Bailey's book The Man Who Would Be Queen, which presented the typology to a general audience. Critics of the typology include sexologists John Bancroft and Charles Allen Moser, psychologist Margaret Nichols, and biologist and activist Julia Serano. The World Professional Association for Transgender Health (WPATH) objected to the inclusion of a mention of autogynephilia that was added to the DSM-5, calling it an unproven theory.

Supporters of the typology include sexologists Bailey, James Cantor, Anne Lawrence, and bioethicist Alice Dreger. Supporters argue that the typology explains differences between the two groups in childhood gender nonconformity, sexual orientation, history of fetishism, and age of transition. Blanchard's typology broke from earlier ones which "excluded the diagnosis of transsexualism" for arousal in response to cross-dressing. Before Blanchard, a recurring theme in scholarly literature was the idea that arousal in response to cross-dressing or cross-gender fantasy was categorically not a feature of transsexual identity.

Background 
Observations suggesting that there exist multiple types of transsexualism date back to the early 20th century.  Havelock Ellis used the terms eonism and sexo-aesthetic inversion to describe cross-gender feelings and behaviors involving "imitation of, and identification with, the admired object." Magnus Hirschfeld classified transsexuals into four types: "homosexual", "bisexual", "heterosexual", and "automonosexual". Hirschfeld used the term automonosexual to describe excitement in natal males to the thought or image of themselves as women.

Beginning in the 1950s, clinicians and researchers developed a variety of classifications of transsexualism. These were variously based on sexual orientation, age of onset, and fetishism. The idea that there are two types of trans women is a recurring theme in the clinical literature. Prior to Blanchard's studies, the two groups were described as "homosexual transsexuals" if sexually attracted to men and "heterosexual fetishistic transvestites" if sexually attracted to women. These labels carried a social stigma of mere sexual fetishism, and contradicted trans women's self-identification as "heterosexual" or "homosexual", respectively.

In 1982, Kurt Freund and colleagues argued there were two distinct types of male-to-female transsexuals, each with distinct causes: one type associated with childhood femininity and androphilia (sexual attraction to men), and another associated with fetishism and gynephilia (sexual attraction to women). Freund stated that the sexual arousal in this latter type could be associated, not only with crossdressing, but also with other feminine-typical behaviors, such as applying make-up or shaving the legs. Blanchard credited Freund with being the first author to distinguish between erotic arousal due to dressing as a woman (transvestic fetishism) and erotic arousal due to fantasizing about being female (which Freund called cross-gender fetishism).

In 1989, Blanchard stated that when he began his studies, researchers had "identified a homosexual type of gender identity disturbance [which] occurs in homosexuals of both sexes. There is general agreement, moreover, on the clinical description of this syndrome as it appears in males and females". According to Blanchard, there was consensus "that gender identity disturbance also occurs in males who are not homosexual but only rarely, if at all, in nonhomosexual females". Blanchard also stated "there is no consensus, however, on the classification of nonhomosexual gender identity disorders. Authorities disagree on the number of different syndromes, the clinical characteristics of the various types, and the labels used to identify them".

Blanchard's research and conclusions came to wider attention with the publication of popular science books on transsexualism, including Men Trapped in Men's Bodies by sexologist and trans woman Anne Lawrence and The Man Who Would Be Queen by sexologist J. Michael Bailey, both of which based their portrayals of male-to-female transsexuals on Blanchard's taxonomy. The concept of autogynephilia in particular received little public interest until Bailey's 2003 publication of The Man Who Would Be Queen, though Blanchard and others had been publishing studies on the topic for nearly 20 years. Bailey's book was followed by peer-reviewed articles critiquing the methodology used by Blanchard.

Research 
Blanchard conducted a series of studies on people with gender dysphoria, analyzing the files of cases seen in the Gender Identity Clinic of the Clarke Institute of Psychiatry and comparing them on multiple characteristics. Studying patients who had felt like a woman at all times for at least a year, he started with Hirschfeld's four types (based on sexual attraction to men, women, both, or neither), and then classified the patients accordingly based on their scores on measures of attraction to men and attraction to women.

Blanchard then compared these four groups regarding how many in each group reported a history of sexual arousal together with cross-dressing. 73% of the heterosexual, asexual, and bisexual groups said they did experience such feelings, with these three groups being statistically indistinguishable from one another, but only 15% of the homosexual group did. He concluded that asexual and bisexual transsexualism were variant forms of heterosexual transsexualism, with transvestism being a related phenomenon. He argued that the common feature among all these individuals was erotic arousal to the thought or image of oneself as a woman, and he coined the term autogynephilia to describe this.

Blanchard reported finding that heterosexual male-to-females were significantly older than homosexual male-to-females (i.e., male-to-females attracted to males): the heterosexual male-to-females said they felt their first cross-gender wishes around the time they first cross-dressed, whereas the homosexual group said their cross-gender wishes preceded cross-dressing (more than 3 years on average). Where fetishistic arousal was acknowledged by over 80% of the heterosexual male-to-females, fewer than 10% of the homosexual group did.

The age at which trans women referred themselves to explore sex reassignment and their self-ratings of childhood femininity were also studied. The androphilic (homosexual) group usually reported that they were quite feminine in childhood, and they first presented clinically at an average age of 26. The other group, made up of heterosexual, bisexual, and analloerotic patients, reported less childhood femininity—some may not have been especially masculine, but few, if any, had been extremely feminine—and presented clinically at the average age of 34.

Blanchard and colleagues conducted a study in 1986 using phallometry (a measure of blood flow to the penis), demonstrating arousal in response to cross-dressing audio narratives among trans women. Although this study is often cited as evidence for autogynephilia, the authors did not attempt to measure subjects' ideas of themselves as women. This study has been cited by proponents of the theory to argue that gynephilic trans women who reported no autogynephilic interests were misrepresenting their erotic interests. The authors concluded that gynephilic gender identity patients who denied experiencing arousal to cross-dressing were still measurably aroused by autogynephilic stimuli, and that autogynephilia among non-androphilic trans women was negatively associated with tendency to color their narrative to be more socially acceptable. Clinical sexologist Charles Allen Moser writes that the study had methodological problems and that the reported data did not support the conclusion, stating that the measured arousal to cross-dressing situations was minimal and consistent with subjects' self-reported arousal. Clinical psychologist Kevin J. Hsu instead cited the study to argue that "the association between autogynephilia and cross-dressing has been well established".

Blanchard theorized that homosexual transsexualism was an extreme expression of homosexuality, considering there to be a continuum of phenomena from homosexuality alone, through gender dysphoric homosexuality, to transsexual homosexuality. Anne Lawrence argued that autogynephilic transsexualism shared a continuum with less severe forms of autogynephilia, such as partial autogynephilia.

Bailey and his book, and Blanchard and his research, have since attracted intense criticism by some clinicians and by many transgender activists. Some writers have criticized autogynephilia as being transphobic. Thomas E. Bevan writes that the concept is insufficiently operationalizable and therefore does not qualify as a scientific theory or hypothesis. Psychologist Anne Lawrence states that Blanchard had already operationalized autogynephilia in 1989. Blanchard's findings have also been criticized on the grounds that they lack reproducibility and that they fail to control for the same traits occurring in cisgender women. Trans author and biologist Julia Serano criticizes the autogynephilia theory as "unfalsifiable and therefore unscientific". Anne Lawrence writes that allegations of unfalsifiability "can be quickly dismissed as inaccurate", since, for example, "repeated objective demonstration of sexual arousal with cross-dressing or cross-gender fantasy in significant numbers of gender dysphoric males who are demonstrably androphilic" can falsify Blanchard's theory. 

According to a 2016 review, structural neuroimaging studies seem to support Blanchard's prediction that androphilic and gynephilic trans women have different brain phenotypes. The authors state that more independent studies of gynephilic trans women are needed to fully confirm Blanchard's hypothesis, as well as "a specifically designed comparison of homosexual MtF, homosexual male, and heterosexual male and female people". A 2021 review examining transgender neurology found similar differences between cisgender homosexuals and heterosexuals.

Terminology 

Blanchard studied two groups of trans women: those who came out as transgender earlier in life and were mostly if not exclusively attracted to men (androphilic), and those who came out later in life and were mostly if not exclusively attracted to women (gynephilic), in order to understand what made them different from one another. He uses the terms homosexual and non-homosexual for these two groups, relative to the person's sex assigned at birth, not their current gender identity. He proposed that many late-transitioning trans women were driven to do so not by gender dysphoria, but by an extreme paraphilia characterized by an erotic interest in oneself as a woman (autogynephilia).

Blanchard said that one type of gender dysphoria/transsexualism manifests itself in individuals who are almost if not exclusively attracted to men (homosexual transsexuals averaged a Kinsey scale measurement of 5–6  and six is the maximum, or a 9.86±2.37 on the Modified Androphilia Scale), whom he referred to as homosexual transsexuals, adopting Freund's terminology. The other type he defined as including those who are attracted almost if not exclusively to females (gynephilic), attracted to both males and females (bisexual), and attracted to neither males nor females (analloerotic or asexual); Blanchard referred to this latter set collectively as the non-homosexual transsexuals. Blanchard says that the "non-homosexual" transsexuals (but not the "homosexual" transsexuals) exhibit autogynephilia, which he defined as a paraphilic interest in having female anatomy.

According to the typology, autogynephilic transsexuals are attracted to femininity while homosexual transsexuals are attracted to masculinity. However, a number of other differences between the types have been reported. Homosexual transsexuals usually begin to seek sex reassignment surgery in their mid-20s, while autogynephilic transsexuals usually seek clinical treatment in their mid-30s or even later. Anne Lawrence states that autogynephilia tends to appear along with other paraphilias. J. Michael Bailey argued that both "homosexual transsexuals" and "autogynephilic transsexuals" were driven to transition mainly for sexual gratification, as opposed to gender-identity reasons.

Anne Lawrence, a proponent of the concept, argues that homosexual transsexuals pursue sex reassignment surgery out of a desire for greater social and romantic success. Lawrence has proposed that autogynephilic transsexuals are more excited about sexual reassignment surgery than homosexual transsexuals. She states that homosexual transsexuals are typically ambivalent or indifferent about SRS, while autogynephilic transsexuals want to have surgery as quickly as possible, are happy to be rid of their penis, and proud of their new genitals.

According to Blanchard, most homosexual transsexuals describe themselves as having been very feminine from a young age. Lawrence argues that homosexual transsexuals are motivated by being very feminine in both behavior and appearance, and by a desire to romantically and sexually attract (ideally very masculine) men, while autogynephilic transsexuals are motivated by their sexual desire and romantic love for being women. Lawrence also states that homosexual transsexuals who seek sex reassignment pass more easily as women.

Blanchard's terminology has been described as archaic and as confusing and controversial among transsexuals seeking sex reassignment surgery. Many authorities, including some supporters of the theory, criticize Blanchard's choice of terminology as confusing or degrading because it emphasizes trans women's assigned sex, and disregards their sexual orientation identity. Frank Leavitt and Jack Berger state that use of the homosexual transsexual label seems to have little merit, partly because some patients may overstate their erotic interest in males in order to receive approval for sex reassignment. They write:

Transgender sociologist and sexologist Aaron Devor wrote, "If what we really mean to say is attracted to males, then say 'attracted to males' or androphilic ... I see absolutely no reason to continue with language that people find offensive when there is perfectly serviceable, in fact better, language that is not offensive." Still other transsexuals are opposed to any and all models of diagnosis which allow medical professionals to prevent anyone from changing their sex, and seek their removal from the DSM.

Linguist Bruce Bagemihl criticized the use of the terms homosexual and non-homosexual to refer to transsexuals by their assigned sex. In 2008, sexologist John Bancroft expressed regret for having used this terminology, which was standard when he used it, to refer to transsexual women, and that he now tries to use words more sensitively.

Autogynephilia 

Autogynephilia (derived from Greek for 'love of oneself as a woman') is a term coined by Blanchard for "a male's propensity to be sexually aroused by the thought of himself as a female", intending for the term to refer to "the full gamut of erotically arousing cross-gender behaviors and fantasies". Blanchard states that he intended the term to subsume transvestism, including for sexual ideas in which feminine clothing plays only a small or no role at all. Other terms for such cross-gender fantasies and behaviors include automonosexuality, eonism, and sexo-aesthetic inversion.

Development of the concept 
Blanchard arrived at his theory of autogynephilia mainly by interpreting self-reports by trans women. In a series of studies at the Clarke Institute of Psychiatry in the late 1980s, he gave questionnaires to gender-dysphoric patients, classing participants as "heterosexual", "asexual", "bisexual", or "homosexual" based on the results of two such questionnaires, the Modified Androphilia and Modified Gynephilia Scales. Blanchard assessed autogynephilia by asking about erotic arousal in association with the fantasy of having various female features such as a vulva or breasts, and the fantasy of being admired as a female by another person. Based on the results, Blanchard writes that the "heterosexual", "asexual", and "bisexual" groups were found to be more similar to each other than any was to the "homosexual" group, concluding that non-homosexual transsexuals, along with transvestites, shared a "history of erotic arousal in association with the thought or image of oneself as a woman".

Following controversy over the portrayal of trans women in The Man Who Would Be Queen, Blanchard distinguished between "the existence or nonexistence of autogynephilia", which he described as "settled", and "theoretical statements involving autogynephilia". Examples of the latter included: (1) all gender-dysphoric males (including MTF transsexuals) who are not attracted to males are instead autogynephilic; (2) autogynephilia does not occur in natal females; (3) the desire for sex reassignment among some natal males is a form of internalized pair-bonding; (4) autogynephilia is a type of heterosexual impulse that also competes with heterosexuality; and (5) autogynephilia is a type of erotic target location error. Blanchard wrote that the accuracy of these theories needed further empirical research to resolve.

Blanchard provides specific case examples to illustrate the autogynephilic sexual fantasies that people reported:

Subtypes 
Blanchard identified four types of autogynephilic sexual fantasy, but stated that co-occurrence of types was common.
 Transvestic autogynephilia: arousal to the act or fantasy of wearing typically feminine clothing
 Behavioral autogynephilia: arousal to the act or fantasy of doing something regarded as feminine
 Physiologic autogynephilia: arousal to fantasies of body functions specific to people regarded as female
 Anatomic autogynephilia: arousal to the fantasy of having a normative woman's body, or parts of one

According to Blanchard, the transvestic-fetishistic type has tended to overshadow the others. He states that anatomic autogynephilia is more associated with gender dysphoria than transvestic autogynephilia. In a later study, a different pattern was reported in a sample of non-transgender autogynephilic men, where higher degrees of anatomic autogynephilia were associated with less gender dysphoria; here, it was instead interpersonal/behavioral and physiological autogynephilia that predicted gender dysphoria. The men in this latter sample were significantly more gender dysphoric than the non-transgender male baseline.

Blanchard in 1993 and Lawrence in 2013 report that some natal males exhibit partial autogynephilia, being sexually aroused by the image or idea of having some but not all normative female anatomy, such as having breasts but retaining their penis and testicles.

Other authors have distinguished between behavioral autogynephilia and interpersonal autogynephilia, with the latter being arousal to being seen or admired as a woman or to having sex with men.

Relationship to gender dysphoria 
The exact nature of the relationship between autogynephilia and gender dysphoria is unclear, and the desire to live as a woman often remains as strong or stronger after an initial sexual response to the idea has faded. Blanchard and Lawrence argue that this is because autogynephilia causes a female gender identity to develop, which becomes an emotional attachment and something aspirational in its own right. Lawrence writes that some transsexual women identify with autogynephilia, many of these feeling positively and some negatively as a result, with a range of opinions reflected as to whether or not this played a motivating role in their decision to transition.

Advocates for the transgender community have challenged Blanchard's and Bailey's explanation of transgender women's motivations to seek sex reassignment. 
Transgender activists and scholars have argued that the concept of autogynephilia unduly sexualizes trans women's gender identity. Arlene Istar Lev says, "Many transwomen find Blanchard's theories insulting, and his insistence that these are evidence-based scientific truths, has only further enraged both the professional and activist communities". Philosopher Matt Drabek writes that the autogynephilia hypothesis threatens to undo the advances made by feminist, queer, and transgender advocacy groups in separating gender identity and sexual orientation from biological sex. According to Simon LeVay, some fear that the concept of autogynephilia will make it harder for gynephilic or "non-classical" MtF transsexuals to receive sex reassignment surgery. Blanchard, Bailey, and Lawrence have each argued that any trans woman who would benefit from SRS should receive it.

In the first peer-reviewed critique of autogynephilia research, Charles Allen Moser found no substantial difference between "autogynephilic" and "homosexual" transsexuals in terms of gender dysphoria, stating that the clinical significance of autogynephilia was unclear. He writes that "although autogynephilia exists, the theory is flawed", and that "many MTFs readily admit that this construct describes their sexual interest and motivation. Nevertheless, it is not clear how accurately [Blanchard's theory] predicts the behavior, history, and motivation of MTFs in general". Moser states that "many of the tenets of the theory are not supported by the existing data, or both supporting and contradictory data exist". In a re-evaluation of the data used by Blanchard and others as the basis for the typology, he states, "it is not clear that autogynephilia is always present" in gynephilic trans women or "always absent" in androphilic trans women, that autogynephilia is significantly different than other paraphilias, and that there is "little reason to suggest that autogynephilia is the [primary] motivation" for gynephilic trans women to seek sex reassignment surgery (SRS). He concludes that the types identified by Blanchard and others may be primarily correlational, not causative, in which case "autogynephilia just becomes another trait" of some trans women, rather than their defining characteristic.

In a 2011 study presenting an alternative to Blanchard's explanation, Larry Nuttbrock and colleagues reported that autogynephilia-like characteristics were strongly associated with a specific generational cohort as well as the ethnicity of the subjects; they hypothesized that autogynephilia may become a "fading phenomenon".

Blanchard has suggested that "non-homosexual" trans women may deny autogynephilia in order to be seen as more socially acceptable and in order to secure a favorable recommendation for sex reassignment. While some trans women report autogynephilic arousal after their gender transition, many others do not. Blanchard and Lawrence argue that such trans women are nonetheless autogynephiles. Lawrence also argues that self-identified homosexual (androphilic) trans women who report histories of autogynephilia are mistaken. Moser disputes this, arguing that if such misrepresentations were common, the self-reported data on which the theory itself is based would be "similarly suspect". According to Moser: "It appears that substantial minorities of homosexual MTFs are autogynephilic and non-homosexual MTFs are not."

As a sexual orientation 
Blanchard and Lawrence have classified autogynephilia as a sexual orientation. Blanchard wrote in 1993 that "autogynephilia might be better characterized as an orientation than as a paraphilia". Blanchard attributed the notion of some cross-dressing men being sexually aroused by the image of themselves as female to Magnus Hirschfeld, who stated, "They [automonosexuals] feel attracted not by the women outside them, but by the woman inside them." Blanchard and Lawrence argue that just like more common sexual orientations such as heterosexuality and homosexuality, it is not only reflected by penile responses to erotic stimuli, but also includes the capacity for pair bond formation and romantic love.

Later studies have found little empirical support for autogynephilia as a sexual identity classification, and sexual orientation  is generally understood to be distinct from gender identity. Elke Stefanie Smith and colleagues describe Blanchard's approach as "highly controversial as it could erroneously suggest an erotic background" to transsexualism.

Gynandromorphophilia, an attraction to people with both male and female anatomy, has been cited as the inverse of autogynephilia, and has been reported as associated with it. Autogynephilic men are usually attracted to women and not to men. Blanchard and Lawrence state that autogynephiles who report attraction to men are actually experiencing "pseudobisexuality", in which the person, rather than being attracted to both the male and female phenotypes, is aroused by a male partner validating their status as an attractive woman; this coexists with the person's basic attraction to women.

According to Blanchard, "An autogynephile does not necessarily become sexually aroused every time he pictures himself as female or engages in feminine behavior, any more than a heterosexual man automatically gets an erection whenever he sees an attractive woman. Thus, the concept of autogynephilia—like that of heterosexuality, homosexuality, or pedophilia—refers to a potential for sexual excitation."

Erotic target location errors 

Blanchard conjectured that sexual interest patterns could have inwardly instead of outwardly directed forms, which he called erotic target location errors (ETLE). Autogynephilia would represent an inwardly directed form of gynephilia, with the attraction to women being redirected towards the self instead of others. These forms of erotic target location errors have also been observed with other base orientations, such as pedophilia, attraction to amputees, and attraction to plush animals. Anne Lawrence wrote that this phenomenon would help to explain an autogynephilia typology.

Cisgender women 
The concept of autogynephilia has been criticized for assuming that only trans women experience sexual desire mediated by their own gender identity. Francisco J. Sánchez and Eric Vilain state that, as with nearly all paraphilias, characteristics consistent with autogynephilia have only been reported among men, while Serano states that autogynephilia is similar to sexual arousal in cisgender women.

Jaimie Veale and colleagues reported in 2008 that an online sample of cisgender women commonly endorsed items on adapted versions of Blanchard's autogynephilia scales, although they stated that it is unlikely that these women experienced autogynephilia in the way that Blanchard conceptualized it.

Moser created an Autogynephilia Scale for Women in 2009, based on items used to categorize MtF transsexuals as autogynephilic in other studies. A questionnaire that included the ASW was distributed to a sample of 51 professional women employed at an urban hospital; 29 completed questionnaires were returned for analysis. By the common definition of ever having erotic arousal to the thought or image of oneself as a woman, 93% of the respondents would be classified as autogynephilic. Using a more rigorous definition of "frequent" arousal to multiple items, 28% would be classified as autogynephilic. While Blanchard stated that "autogynephilia does not occur in women", Moser writes that both studies found "significant numbers of women" scoring as autogynephilic, using measures similar to Blanchard's.

Lawrence criticized Moser's methodology and conclusions and stated that genuine autogynephilia occurs very rarely, if ever, in cisgender women as their experiences are superficially similar but the erotic responses are ultimately markedly different. Moser responded that Lawrence had made multiple errors by comparing the wrong items. Lawrence argues that the scales used by both Veale et al. and Moser fail to differentiate between arousal from wearing provocative clothing or imagining that potential partners find one attractive, and arousal merely from the idea that one is a woman or has a woman's body.

In a 2022 study, Bailey and Kevin J. Hsu write that "it remains unknown whether any natal females experience autogynephilia" based on an application of Blanchard's original Core Autogynephilia Scale to four samples of "autogynephilic natal males", four samples of "non-autogynephilic natal males" and two samples of "natal females". Serano and Veale argue that because Bailey and Hsu compared "natal females" with "natal males" pre-selected for autogynephilia, their results were artificially skewed against finding autogynephilia among cisgender women. They write that it unsurprising that few cisgender women would respond positively to Blanchard's Core Autogynephilia Scale since "Blanchard crafted these questions specifically with AMAB [assigned male at birth] trans people in mind". Serano and Veale also criticize Bailey and Hsu for omitting Blanchard’s Cross-Gender Fetishism Scale and Autogynephilic Interpersonal Fantasy Scale, both of which played a central role in Blanchard's original conception of autogynephilia; they speculate that the "natal female" samples may have seemed more "autogynephilic" had they been given these surveys. According to Serano and Veale, Blanchard considered the "anatomic autogynephilia" studied by Bailey and Hsu to be only a small subset of autogynephilia in general. Moser criticizes Bailey and Hsu for "compar[ing] the scores of women AFAB [assigned female at birth] with 'erotic crossdressers' (not individuals who have transitioned from male to female)", saying their finding "does little to support or refute the question of whether autogynephilia exists in women AFAB or not".

Transfeminist critique 
Critics of the autogynephlia hypothesis include transfeminists such as Julia Serano and Talia Mae Bettcher. Serano describes the concept as flawed, unscientific, and needlessly stigmatizing. According to Serano, "Blanchard's controversial theory is built upon a number of incorrect and unfounded assumptions, and there are many methodological flaws in the data he offers to support it." She argues that flaws in Blanchard's original studies include: being conducted among overlapping populations primarily at the Clarke Institute in Toronto without nontranssexual controls; subtypes not being empirically derived but instead "begging the question that transsexuals fall into subtypes based on their sexual orientation"; and further research finding a non-deterministic correlation between cross-gender arousal and sexual orientation. She states that Blanchard did not discuss the idea that cross-gender arousal may be an effect, rather than a cause, of gender dysphoria, and that Blanchard assumed that correlation implied causation.

Serano also states that the wider idea of cross-gender arousal was affected by the prominence of sexual objectification of women, accounting for both a relative lack of cross-gender arousal in transsexual men and similar patterns of autogynephilic arousal in non-transsexual women. She criticised proponents of the typology, claiming that they dismiss non-autogynephilic, non-androphilic transsexuals as misreporting or lying while not questioning androphilic transsexuals, describing it as "tantamount to hand-picking which evidence counts and which does not based upon how well it conforms to the model", either making the typology unscientific due to its unfalsifiability, or invalid due to the nondeterministic correlation that later studies found. Serano says that the typology undermined lived experience of transsexual women, contributed to pathologisation and sexualisation of transsexual women, and the literature itself fed into the stereotype of transsexuals as "purposefully deceptive", which could be used to justify discrimination and violence against transsexuals. According to Serano, studies have usually found that some non-homosexual transsexuals report having no autogynephilia.

Bettcher, based on her own experience as a trans woman, has critiqued the notion of autogynephilia, and "target errors" generally, within a framework of "erotic structuralism," arguing that the notion conflates essential distinctions between "source of attraction" and "erotic content," and "(erotic) interest" and "(erotic) attraction," thus misinterpreting what she prefers to call, following Serano, "female embodiment eroticism." She maintains that not only is "an erotic interest in oneself as a gendered being," as she puts it, a non-pathological and indeed necessary component of regular sexual attraction to others, but within the framework of erotic structuralism, a "misdirected" attraction to oneself as postulated by Blanchard is outright nonsensical.

Trans men 
Blanchard's typology is mainly concerned with transgender women. Richard Ekins and Dave King state that female-to-male transsexuals (trans men) are absent from the typology, while Blanchard, Cantor, and Katherine Sutton distinguish between gynephilic and androphilic trans men. They state that gynephilic trans men are the counterparts of androphilic trans women, that they experience strong childhood gender nonconformity, and that they generally begin to seek sex reassignment in their mid-20s. They describe androphilic trans men as a rare but distinct group who say they want to become gay men, and, according to Blanchard, are often specifically attracted to gay men. Cantor & Sutton state that while this may seem analogous to autogynephilia, no distinct paraphilia for this has been identified.

Inclusion in the DSM 
In 1980 in the DSM-III, a  new diagnosis was introduced, that of "302.5 Transsexualism" under "Other Psychosexual Disorders". This was an attempt to provide a diagnostic category for gender identity disorders. The diagnostic category, transsexualism, was for gender dysphoric individuals who demonstrated at least two years of continuous interest in transforming their physical and social gender status. The subtypes were asexual, homosexual (same "biological sex"), heterosexual (other "biological sex") and unspecified.  This was removed in the DSM-IV, in which gender identity disorder replaced transsexualism. Previous taxonomies, or systems of categorization, used the terms classic transsexual or true transsexual, terms once used in differential diagnoses.

The DSM-IV-TR included autogynephilia as an "associated feature" of gender identity disorder and as a common occurrence in the transvestic fetishism disorder, but does not classify autogynephilia as a disorder by itself.

Moser advances three reasons to question the inclusion of autogynephilia as a sign of a clinical disorder: (1) a focus on autogynephilia may have overshadowed other factors involved in gender dysphoria, creating "a new stereotype" which patients seeking sex reassignment must adhere to; (2) some proponents of the theory suggest that trans women who do not report sexual interest consistent with their typing according to the theory are mistaken or "in denial", which is disrespectful and potentially harmful; and (3) the theory could imply that "all gender manifestations [are] secondary to sexual orientation".

The paraphilias working group on the DSM-5, chaired by Ray Blanchard, included both with autogynephilia and with autoandrophilia as specifiers to transvestic disorder in an October 2010 draft of the DSM-5. This proposal was opposed by the World Professional Association for Transgender Health (WPATH), citing a lack of empirical evidence for these specific subtypes. WPATH argued that there was no scientific consensus on the theory, and that there was a lack of longitudinal studies on the development of transvestic fetishism. With autoandrophilia was removed from the final draft of the manual. Blanchard later said he had initially included it to avoid criticism: "I proposed it simply in order not to be accused of sexism [...] I don't think the phenomenon even exists." When published in 2013, the DSM-5 included With autogynephilia (sexual arousal by thoughts, images of self as a female) as a specifier to 302.3 Transvestic disorder (intense sexual arousal from cross-dressing fantasies, urges or behaviors); the other specifier is With fetishism (sexual arousal to fabrics, materials or garments).

Societal impact

O'Donnabhain v. Commissioner 

In the 2010 U.S. Tax Court case O'Donnabhain v. Commissioner, the Internal Revenue Service cited Blanchard's typology as justification for denying a transgender woman's tax deductions for medical costs relating to treatment of her gender identity disorder, claiming the procedures were not medically necessary. The court found in favor of the plaintiff, Rhiannon O'Donnabhain, ruling that she should be allowed to deduct the costs of her treatment, including sex reassignment surgery and hormone therapy. In its decision, the court declared the IRS's position "at best a superficial characterization of the circumstances" that was "thoroughly rebutted by the medical evidence".

Anti-LGBT groups 
Serano has written that trans-exclusionary radical feminists, or "gender critical" feminists, started embracing Blanchard's autogynephilia theory starting in the 2000's. One early proponent of the autogynephilia theory was radical feminist Sheila Jeffreys. The concept has been used to imply that trans women are sexually deviant men. The autogynephilia theory became popular on "gender critical" websites such as 4thWaveNow, Mumsnet, and the Reddit community r/GenderCritical.

According to an October 2018 review of anti-LGBT activities by the Southern Poverty Law Center (SPLC), both Ray Blanchard and J. Michael Bailey have written articles for 4thWaveNow, which it describes as an anti-trans website. According to a study of that and other rhetoric, "Bailey and Blanchard's work has long been criticised for perpetuating stereotypes and prejudices against trans women, notably suggesting that LGBQ trans women's primary motivation for transitioning is sexual arousal." The study refers to autogynephilia as a discredited theory.

According to the SPLC, the autogynephilia theory has been promoted by anti-LGBT hate groups. These include Family Research Council (FRC), United Families International (UFI), and the American College of Pediatricians (ACPeds). In a May 2018 report, the SPLC referred to Blanchard as an anti-trans psychologist.

See also 
 Classification of transsexual and transgender people
 Autoeroticism
 Partialism
 Transgender sexuality
 List of transgender-related topics

Notes

References

External links 

Men and sexuality
Paraphilias
Sexology
Gender identity
Sexual fetishism
Sexual orientation
Sexuality and society
Transgender sexuality
Trans women